John Olof Norrman (29 July 1929 – 14 December 2013) was a Swedish geographer and geomorphologist known for his contributions to the coastal dynamics. Together with the other Ph.D. students of Filip Hjulström; Anders Rapp, Valter Axelsson and Åke Sundborg, Norrman was part of what came to be known as the Uppsala School of Physical Geography. Norrman became in 1971 professor of physical geography at Uppsala and in 1987 he was elected member of the Royal Swedish Academy of Sciences.

References

Process geomorphologists
Swedish geographers
Members of the Royal Swedish Academy of Sciences
1929 births
2013 deaths
Academic staff of Uppsala University
Swedish geomorphologists